51st Army may refer to:

 51st Army (Russia)
 Fifty-First Army (Japan)

See also
 51st Division (disambiguation)
 51st Brigade (disambiguation)
 51st Regiment (disambiguation)
 51st Battalion (disambiguation)